Revirginized is a 2021 Philippine comedy film directed by Darryl Yap under Viva Films and starring Sharon Cuneta.

Premise
Carmela (Sharon Cuneta) gets pregnant at age 16 therefore she never got a proper coming of age experience. As an adult, Carmela deals with the end of her marriage with her husband (Albert Martinez). She meets her goddaughter and her friends who are going to a beach party and coerced her goddaughter to let her join the event threatening to snitch her to her mother if she does not comply. At the beach, Carmela parties and "rediscovers" her youth in the process. She also went on to have a one night stand with Morph (Marco Gumabao), a young hunk, who later confesses his own feelings for her.

Cast
Sharon Cuneta as Carmela
Marco Gumabao as Morph
Rosanna Roces as Girlie
Albert Martinez as Bart
Cristina Gonzales as Charlotte

Production
Revirginized, under the working title MILF, was produced under Viva Films with Daryl Yap as director. Principal photography took place in Subic which started in March 2021.

Casting
Sharon Cuneta remarking about choosing to star in Revirginized said she has often featured in "wholesome" movies in the past adding that she accepted to get involved in the film for a more challenging role. According to director Daryl Yap, the inspiration for Carmela's character is Sharon Cuneta herself since he intends Revirginized to be a tribute to his mother who is a Sharonian or an avid fan of the actress. Yap said he wanted to present the "most shocking" version of the actress through his film.

Release
Revirginized was first released through online streaming platforms on August 6, 2021 on KTX.ph, iWantTFC, IPTV, Sky PPV The film reportedly became the best-selling film in KTX.ph in terms of the number of pre-sold tickets. The film also had a theatrical release in select cinemas in the United States and Canada on August 13, 2021.

References

External links

Philippine comedy films
2021 comedy films